University of Tarapacá is a university in Arica, Chile. It is a derivative university part of the Chilean Traditional Universities. The university publishes Revista Chungará a journal on anthropology and archaeology.

External links
 Universidad de Tarapacá official web site in spanish